Kévin Bodin (born March 30, 1987 in Quimperlé) is a French professional footballer, who currently coaches and plays for FC Trébeurden-Pleumeur Bodou.

Career
He began his career in 2001 for the Centre De Préformation De Ploufragan and moved 2002 to the youth side from En Avant de Guingamp. In the season 2006/2007 was promoted to the Ligue 2 team of En Avant de Guingamp. After eight years on senior and youth side for EA Guingamp signed on 11 November 2010 for Lannion FC.

Notes

1987 births
Living people
People from Quimperlé
French footballers
Association football fullbacks
Ligue 2 players
En Avant Guingamp players
Lannion FC players
USJA Carquefou players
Sportspeople from Finistère
Footballers from Brittany